Jonathan Derrick Evans (born April 2, 1985) is an American politician and convicted felon. He served as a member of the West Virginia House of Delegates for the 19th district from December 1, 2020, to January 9, 2021. Evans participated in the 2021 United States Capitol attack, an action for which he was criminally charged. He was arrested on January 8, 2021, and resigned from the House of Delegates the next day. On March 18, 2022, he pleaded guilty to a felony charge of civil disorder and was sentenced to 90 days in prison in June 2022.

Early life and education 
Evans is a native of Prichard, West Virginia. After attending Marshall University for one year, he earned a bachelor's degree from West Liberty University.

Career

Early career 
Evans worked as a high school teacher and football coach in Wayne County, coaching football at Tolsia High School from 2013 to 2017. In January 2017, he was hired to be an assistant quarterback coach for the Virginia Tech Hokies football team.

Anti-abortion activities
Before pursuing elected office, Evans was known as a confrontational local anti-abortion protester who, over the course of 2018 and 2019, harassed patients, staff, and volunteer escorts at the only clinic in West Virginia that performed abortions. Evans would livestream himself confronting people outside the clinic to tens of thousands of viewers. In addition to shouting abuse, Evans would livestream himself repeating clinic workers' names over and over and screaming their personal details. His activities prompted the clinic to put up a 10-foot high fence and alert police. Evans' harassment led a woman to file for and receive a restraining order over "many threats to my safety online and relentless harassment in person"; Evans subsequently violated the order.

Evans also frequently appeared at the West Virginia State Capitol, where he took photographs and videos of state legislators. Democratic State Delegate Danielle Walker said that Evans referred to her as "satanic" and equated her support for LGBTQ rights to defending pedophilia.

Politics 
In 2016, Evans ran to represent the 19th district in the West Virginia House of Delegates.  Initially Evans ran as a Democrat, but finished sixth in the primary. In the general election, Evans refiled to be on the ballot as a Libertarian; he was unable to win one the district's two seats. In 2020, Evans ran once again as a Republican advancing through the primary and winning a seat in the general.

Evans was embroiled in controversy during his 2020 campaign stemming from his membership in a Facebook group chat in which homophobic and Islamophobic language was used. Fellow Delegate John Mandt, an alleged participant in the group chat, claimed that the messages attributed to him were fabricated but nonetheless announced his resignation. Evans not only confirmed his own participation in the group chat, but said that he stood by his comments calling Nihad Awad a "terrorist."

On January 6, 2023, Evans announced plans to run for Congress, challenging incumbent Rep. Carol Miller in the 2024 Republican primary.

Participation in the 2021 Capitol attack 
Evans participated in the storming of the United States Capitol on January 6, 2021. Social media posts by Evans depict him traveling to Washington, D.C., with a busload of fellow Donald Trump supporters.

The Associated Press notes that in a video of Evans as he was attempting to breach the Capitol, he also could be heard chanting Trump's name repeatedly. Evans subsequently denied involvement in any destruction of property that took place during the riot, claiming that he was "simply there as an independent member of the media to film history."

Evans crossed the downed fence and entered the Capitol building filming himself inside shouting "We're in, we're in. Derrick Evans is in the Capitol!" Telling the crowd, "We're in! Keep it moving, baby!" And later "Our house!" Inside the Capitol halls he said, "I don't know where we're going. I'm following the crowd."

His actions were condemned by West Virginia's state House Speaker Roger Hanshaw, state House Minority Leader Doug Skaff, U.S. Senator Joe Manchin, and Governor Jim Justice.

Two days later, Evans was arrested and charged with one count of "knowingly entering or remaining in any restricted building or grounds without lawful authority" and one count of "violent entry and disorderly conduct on Capitol Grounds." 

Evans resigned on January 10, 2021, saying, "I take full responsibility for my actions." 

He pleaded not guilty to four misdemeanor charges in May 2021. In July 2021, a grand jury returned a five-count indictment against Evans, including the four previously charged misdemeanors and a new felony charge, obstructing an official proceeding and aiding or abetting. Negotiation of a possible plea agreement was ongoing in August 2021. On February 3, 2022, the day before Evans was supposed to appear in court for a hearing, Evans struck a plea agreement and lawyers asked the court for a hearing later in the month without releasing the terms of the plea agreement.

On March 18, 2022, Evans pleaded guilty to a felony charge of civil disorder stemming from the Capitol riot. Evans was sentenced to three months in prison on June 22, 2022. He reported to federal prison on July 25, 2022. He was held at the Federal Correctional Institution, Milan in Milan, Michigan through October 23, 2022.

In 2023, Evans reversed his admissions of guilt for his actions on January 6, claiming to be a victim of political persecution and labelling himself as a "J6 Patriot." He also claimed that he was being forced into apologizing by the media so he could win his bid for a United States House of Representatives seat. Evans also made an appearance at CPAC 2023. Alongside fellow rioters Michael Straka and Simone Gold, he was a speaker at a session titled "True Stories of January 6: The Prosecuted Speak."

Personal life 
Evans and his wife Melissa have three children and live in Wayne County, West Virginia.

Electoral history

References

External links 
 Biography at Ballotpedia
 Webpage (archived) at West Virginia House of Delegates

1985 births
Convicted participants in the January 6 United States Capitol attack
21st-century American politicians
Candidates in the 2016 United States elections
Coaches of American football from West Virginia
Living people
Members of the West Virginia House of Delegates
People from Wayne County, West Virginia
Schoolteachers from West Virginia
West Liberty University alumni
West Virginia Democrats
West Virginia Libertarians
West Virginia Republicans
Virginia Tech Hokies football coaches
West Virginia politicians convicted of crimes
Criminals from West Virginia
American male criminals
American government officials convicted of crimes
Far-right politicians in the United States
Candidates in the 2024 United States House of Representatives elections